Call Me King is a 2015 American action crime drama written, produced and directed by R.L. Scott. Scott is also the film's cinematographer and choreographed the film's fight sequences. Call Me King had a limited theatrical release in the United States on September 4, 2015 during the Labor Day holiday weekend.

Cast
 Amin Joseph as Rhyis
 Bai Ling as Li Soo
 Chris Mulkey as Angelo
 Bill Cobbs as Malachi
 Gabrielle Dennis as Leena
 Jonathan McDaniel as Zho

References

External links
 
 

2015 films
American action drama films
2015 action drama films
Films scored by George Kallis
2010s English-language films
2010s American films